The Holy Fvck Tour was the seventh concert tour by American singer Demi Lovato in support of her eighth studio album Holy Fvck (2022). The tour began on August 13, 2022, in Springfield, Illinois and concluded on November 10, 2022, in Rosemont. The tour visited North America and South America through three legs. Supporting acts in North America included Dead Sara and Royal & the Serpent.

Background
On June 6, 2022, Lovato announced her eighth studio album, Holy Fvck. A day later, Lovato announced that she would embark on a concert tour supporting the album. American hard rock band Dead Sara and singer-songwriter Royal & the Serpent were set to open the North American leg.

Previously, Lovato had been confirmed to perform at several state fairs, including Illinois and Iowa State Fair. A year prior, she also was announced as one of the performers at the Rock in Rio festival in Brazil.

Reception
Julia Koscelnick of The GW Hatchet praised her concert in Washington, D.C., quoted that, "she never fails to dazzle with her vocals, but a lack of energy during her show to take her time to rest, fans could emphathize with Lovato taking time off to focus on resting her vocal cords." Jessica Jakubowicz of the Concordian, gave their positive review for her concert in Montreal, praising their all-girl band and her vocals, which their vocals fits their rock arrangements of her back-catalogue.

Set list

This set list was taken from the concert on September 22, 2022, in Wheatland, California. It does not represent all shows throughout the tour.

 "Holy Fvck"
 "Freak"
 "Substance"
 "Eat Me"
 "Confident"
 "Here We Go Again"
 "Remember December"
 "La La Land" 
 "Don't Forget"
 "The Art of Starting Over"
 "4 Ever 4 Me" 
 "Sorry Not Sorry"
 "City of Angels"
 "Skyscraper"
 "29"
 "Heart Attack"
"Skin of My Teeth"
Encore
 "Happy Ending"
"Cool for the Summer"

Notes
From September 22 to 27, Dead Sara joined Lovato to perform "Help Me" replacing "The Art of Starting Over", and again from October 21 to November 6.
From September 28 to October 19, Royal & the Serpent joined Lovato to perform "Eat Me", and again on November 9 and 10
During the show in Inglewood, Ashlee Simpson joined Lovato on stage to perform "La La".
During the first show in New York City, John Rzeznik of Goo Goo Dolls joined Lovato to perform "Iris".

Shows

Notes

Personnel
Credits adapted from Riff Magazine.

Band:
Demi Lovato – vocals, guitar
Brittany Bowman – drums
Leanne Bowes – bass
Dani McGinley – keyboards
Nita Strauss – guitar

References

2022 concert tours
Demi Lovato concert tours